The Trapp Family in America is a 1958 West German comedy drama film about the real-life Austrian musical Trapp Family directed by Wolfgang Liebeneiner and starring Ruth Leuwerik, Hans Holt, and Josef Meinrad. It is a sequel to the 1956 film The Trapp Family. It was shot at the Bavaria Studios in Munich. The film's sets were designed by the art director Robert Herlth.

Plot
The von Trapps have left Austria and are now in the United States. But the Land of Unlimited Possibilities turns out to be anything but for our hapless heroes. Though the American public has demonstrated countless times, that they'll pay anything to hear German folk songs and other pop songs, the von Trapps on the verge of being penniless and suicidal, thanks to Father Wasner, who's determined to teach Americans to appreciate great church music ... no matter how much his "cultural mission" pushes the von Trapps to starvation.  Only the insistence of paying patrons that they drop the holy roller music and the guffaws of the audience abandoning their shows finally convinces Maria, that it's time to start entertaining the paying public and give Palestrina a rest. Eventually they receive critical acclaim and a large following for their music. Later, they purchase a farm in Stowe Vermont and decide to remain in America.

Cast
 Ruth Leuwerik as Baroness von Trapp
 Hans Holt as Baron von Trapp
 Josef Meinrad as Dr. Wasner
 Adrienne Gessner as Mrs. Hammerfield
 Michael Ande as Werner von Trapp
 Knut Mahlke as Rupert von Trapp
 Ursula Wolff as Agathe von Trapp
 Angelika Werth as Hedwig von Trapp
 Monika Wolf as Maria F. von Trapp
 Ursula Ettrich as Rosemarie von Trapp
 Monika Ettrich as Martina von Trapp
 Wolfgang Wahl  as Patrick
 Daniela and Annette Edel as Baby Johannes
 Peter Esser as Mr. Hammerfield
 Till Klockow as Bronx-Lilly
 Holger Hagen as Mr, Harris

References

Citations

Sources

External links
 

1958 films
1950s biographical films
Films about music and musicians
Films directed by Wolfgang Liebeneiner
Films set in 1939
Films set in 1940
Films set in the United States
German biographical films
1950s German-language films
German sequel films
Trapp family
West German films
Gloria Film films
Films shot at Bavaria Studios
1950s German films
Foreign films set in the United States